Colma: The Musical is a 2006 American musical independent film directed by Richard Wong and written by H.P. Mendoza. Wong's feature directorial debut, shot on location in the city of Colma, California and parts of San Francisco, is a coming of age story based on the lives of and the relationships between three teenagers living in Colma and how they deal with newfound problems that challenge their friendship. Along the way, they also learn what to hold on to and how best to follow their dreams.

The film features 13 songs all written and produced by H.P. Mendoza. Colma: The Musical was released through Roadside Attractions in partnership with Lions Gate Entertainment.

The film premiered March 21, 2006 at the San Francisco International Asian American Film Festival. After a year of touring the film festival circuit and winning three Special Jury Prizes, Colma: The Musical was theatrically released on June 22, 2007.

Plot
The film follows three teenagers, Billy (Jake Moreno), Rodel (H.P. Mendoza), and Maribel (L.A. Renigen), and their exploits only weeks after graduating from high school. After Billy decides to audition for the regional musical, he meets a college student, Tara (Sigrid Sutter), who is also an aspiring actor. Billy's ambition expectedly puts a strain on his relationships with his best friends, Rodel and Maribel. Rodel, meanwhile, struggles with coming out of the closet to his single father (Larry Soriano), while Maribel struggles to figure out what to do next in life.

Cast
 Jake Moreno as Billy
 H.P. Mendoza as Rodel
 L.A. Renigen as Maribel
 Sigrid Sutter as Tara
 Larry Soriano as Rodel's father
 Brian Raffi as Julio
 Gigi Guizado as Kattia
 Paul Kolsanoff as Kevin
 Allison Torneros as Amanda
 Kat Kneisel as Joanna
 David Scott Keller as Michael

History
After writing a concept album called Colma: The Musical as a birthday present for his childhood friend, he reunited with film school classmate Richard Wong, who had just finished working on the television show, Arrested Development and was looking for a script to direct.  When Wong listened to a track from Mendoza's concept album, he asked Mendoza how long it would take to turn it into a script.  After seven days, a first draft was born, Mendoza flew from Philadelphia to San Francisco and the plans were set in motion.  After 18 days of shooting and several months of editing, a feature film was made for a budget of roughly $15,000.  The film, called "an itty-bitty movie with a great big heart" by The New York Times went on to win three Special Jury Prizes on the film festival circuit and was acquired by Roadside Attractions and Lionsgate Entertainment.

Release
The film was distributed by Roadside Attractions theatrically on June 22, 2007. The DVD was released on November 20, 2007 by Lionsgate Home Entertainment with deleted scenes and an audio commentary by director Richard Wong and writer H.P. Mendoza.

Reception
The film received mostly favorable reviews and the review aggregation website Rotten Tomatoes shows Colma: The Musical with 90% of the 30 collected reviews judged as positive.

Colma: The Musical premiered at the San Francisco International Asian American Film Festival and won its Special Jury Prize for Best Narrative Feature. The premiere was held at the AMC Kabuki 8 in its 700-seat house which was packed with people who knew nothing about the filmmakers, but possibly appeared based on the title of the film alone. The film was praised by young Asian Americans who identified with the lost, if a little wayward, teenagers.

Manohla Dargis of The New York Times called it "an itty-bitty movie with a great big heart" while Ruthe Stein of the San Francisco Chronicle said that the film "deserves to be seen for its sheer originality and audacity".

Negative reviews came from the Village Voice with Julia Wallace saying "it's unfortunate that Colma pays so little attention to Colma; it may as well be set anywhere", while Kyle Smith of the New York Post says "The songs sound like they were recorded on a toy synthesizer in someone's basement, and neither of the two male leads can sing."

After years of life on DVD and online instant viewing via Netflix, Colma: The Musical has been considered a cult favorite by many and has been paid tribute by various YouTube clips and high school musical renditions of the film.  Ruthe Stein of the San Francisco Chronicle likened the film to American Graffiti and Diner, while Jurgen Fauth of About.com compared the film to Mallrats, Ghost World, and Once.

Awards and nominations
 Special Jury Prize - San Francisco International Asian American Film Festival
 Special Jury Prize - Los Angeles Asian Pacific Film Festival
 Special Jury Prize - San Diego Asian Film Festival
 Gotham Award - Best Film Not in Theaters (Nomination)
 Independent Spirit Award - Someone to Watch; Richard Wong (Nomination)

See also
 Fruit Fly (2009), film directed by H.P. Mendoza

References

External links
 
 
 
 Interview with director Richard Wong

2000s musical comedy films
2006 films
American musical comedy films
American coming-of-age films
Asian-American LGBT-related films
Asian-American musical films
Films shot in San Francisco
Films about Filipino Americans
American independent films
Films set in the San Francisco Bay Area
Lionsgate films
LGBT-related musical comedy films
Roadside Attractions films
2006 directorial debut films
2006 comedy films
2006 LGBT-related films
2000s English-language films
2000s American films